Henry Denne (c. 1606–1660) was a Church of England clergyman and controversialist, later a prominent General Baptist.

Life
He is identified as the son of David Denne of Kent, educated at Latton, Essex under his uncle, Thomas Denne. He matriculated as a sizar at Sidney Sussex College, Cambridge in 1621, graduating B.A. in 1625 and M.A. 1628. In 1630 he was ordained by Theophilus Feild, Bishop of St David's, and soon afterwards became curate of Pirton, Hertfordshire, a preaching position he held for more than ten years.

In 1641 he was one of the ministers selected by the committee of the House of Commons for preferment; in the same year he preached at Baldock at the visitation held there, giving offence by attacking the vices of the clergy. This sermon was subsequently published as "The Doctrine and Conversation of John Baptist" (1642). Soon after the outbreak of the First English Civil War Denne became convinced of the unscriptural nature of the baptism of infants, and publicly professing himself a baptist was received by immersion in 1643, when he joined the congregation at the meeting-house in Bell Alley, London. He helped to lead it along with General Baptists Thomas Lambe and Samuel Oates, who "preached universal grace, the Arminian tenets". He frequently preached both there and in the country. He was considered as a "great Arminian" by Thomas Edwards.  

His change of opinion brought persecution, and in 1644 he was apprehended in Cambridgeshire, by order of the "committee" for that county, for preaching against infant baptism. After he had lain in Cambridge gaol for some time, his case, through the intercession of some friends, was referred to a committee of the House, and he was sent to London, where he was confined in Lord Petre's house in Aldersgate Street until, his case having been investigated, the committee ordered his release. Among his fellow-prisoners was Dr Daniel Featley, the opponent of the baptists, whose book, The Dippers Dipt was brought to Denne's notice. As soon as he was released he challenged Featley to a disputation. Featley, pleading the danger of publicly disputing without a licence, declined to continue with it. Denne then wrote The Foundation of Children's Baptism discovered and rased; an answer to Dr Featley, &c. (1645), which was for a time a standard authority among the baptists.

Shortly after his release Denne obtained the living of Eltisley in Cambridgeshire, and, though strongly opposed to both presbyterians and prelatists, managed to retain it for several years. The committee of the county endeavoured to prevent his preaching at St Ives, but on being interrupted he left the building, and going into a neighbouring churchyard preached from under a tree to a large congregation. In June 1646 he was apprehended by the magistrates at Spalding for baptising in the river, but was released. He was, however, persecuted by the neighbouring ministers, and he resigned his living and became a soldier in the parliamentary army. At the conclusion of the civil war he again became a preacher.

In 1658 he held a public dispute, lasting two days, concerning infant baptism with Peter Gunning in St Clement Danes.

Works
Although a partisan, his views were moderate: by some he was reproached for being an antinomian, and by others as an Arminian. Besides the works already mentioned, he wrote:

 "The Man of Sin discovered, whom the Lord will destroy with the brightness of His Coming", 1645.
 "The Drag-Net of the Kingdom of Heaven; or Christ's drawing all Men", 1646. 
 "The Levellers' Design discovered", 1649.
 "A Contention for Truth; in two several Disputations at St. Clement's Church, between Dr Gunning and Henry Denne, concerning Infant Baptism", 1658.
 "The Quaker no Papist, in answer to The Quaker Disarmed", 1659.
 "An Epistle recommended to all Prisons in this City and Nation. To such as chuse Restraint rather than the Violation of their Consciences, wherein is maintained: (1) The Lawfulness of an Oath; (2) The Antiquity of an Oath; (3) The Universality of it. With the most material Objections answered", 1660. 
 "Grace, Mercy, and Truth"

Notes and references
 Oxford Dictionary of National Biography, Denne, Henry (1605/6?-1666), General Baptist minister and religious controversialist by T. L. Underwood.

Citations

Sources

External links
  Henry Denne Biographical Information
  Henry Denne Collected Writings

1606 births
1666 deaths
17th-century Baptists
17th-century English Anglican priests
Alumni of Sidney Sussex College, Cambridge
Arminian ministers
Arminian writers
English Baptists
People from Kent
Roundheads
Year of birth uncertain